Natalia Hadjiloizou (born 23 March 1979 in Vitebsk, Belarus as Natalya Baranovskaya;) is a professional Cypriot swimmer.

Swimming career
She made her Olympic debut at the 1996 Summer Olympics in Atlanta for Belarus.

Hadjiloizou also competed in the 2000 Summer Olympics in Sydney for Belarus, where she placed 6th in the 200 m freestyle and did not advance out of the preliminary heats in the 400 m freestyle.

She won the 'Open' 1999 British Championship in the 400 metres freestyle.

After deciding to retire aged 22 in 2001, she moved to Cyprus where she married her coach Giorgios, and later competed for Cyprus at the 2008 Summer Olympics where she ranked 45th in the 100 metre butterfly event.

References 

1979 births
Living people
Sportspeople from Vitebsk
Cypriot female swimmers
Belarusian female freestyle swimmers
Female butterfly swimmers
Swimmers at the 1996 Summer Olympics
Swimmers at the 2000 Summer Olympics
Swimmers at the 2008 Summer Olympics
Olympic swimmers of Belarus
Olympic swimmers of Cyprus
Medalists at the FINA World Swimming Championships (25 m)
Belarusian emigrants to Cyprus
European Aquatics Championships medalists in swimming